The Netherlands national under-21 football team is the national under-21 team of the Netherlands and is controlled by the Royal Dutch Football Association.  The team competes in the European Under-21 Championship, held every two years.

Following the realignment of UEFA's youth competitions in 1976, the Dutch Under-21 team was formed. The team did not have a very good record, failing to qualify for nine of the fifteen tournaments.  The team did not enter for the 1978 competition, but since then has reached the semi-finals twice, and qualified for the last eight on three other occasions.

Since the under-21 competition rules insist that players must be 21 or under at the start of a two-year competition, technically it is an U-23 competition. For this reason, the Netherlands' record in the preceding U-23 competitions is also shown.  The first competitive match was in the "Under-23 Challenge", a match which they lost.  The team qualified for the last eight of each of the three U-23 tournaments.

In 2006 the Netherlands national under-21 football team of coach Foppe de Haan won the 2006 European Under-21 Championship. Klaas-Jan Huntelaar became top scorer and player of the tournament with four goals, and also broke the all-time goalscoring record of 15 goals previously held by Roy Makaay and Arnold Jan Bruggink, in his last match with the team as he pushed this record to eighteen  goals. The following year, Netherlands national under-21 football team successfully defended their title by winning the 2007 European Under-21 Championship in the final against Serbia with 4–1. Maceo Rigters was the top scorer of the competition with four goals and Royston Drenthe was the Player of the Tournament. The win meant that the Netherlands qualified for the 2008 Summer Olympics in Beijing. The team failed to qualify for the 2009 European Under-21 Championship, after losing out to Switzerland in their final qualifying match.

Competitive record

UEFA U-23 Championship record
The Netherlands were randomly chosen to play against Bulgaria for the title in a one-off match in Sofia, which the Netherlands lost.
17 April 1968: Bulgaria 3–1 Netherlands.

UEFA U-23 Championship Record

(*) Denotes draws including knockout matches decided via penalty shoot-out.

UEFA U-21 Championship Record

(*) Denotes draws including knockout matches decided via penalty shoot-out.

Olympic Games

Results and fixtures 2021–2023

2023 UEFA European Under-21 Championship

Qualification

Players

Current squad
 The following players were called up for the 2023 UEFA European Under-21 Championship qualification matches.
 Match dates: 3, 7 and 11 June 2022
 Opposition: ,  and 
 Caps and goals correct as of: 3 June 2022, after the match against 
 Names in bold''' denote players who have been capped for the Senior team.

Recent call ups
The following players have previously been called up to the Netherlands under-21 squad in the last year and remain eligible.

INJ Withdrew due to injury.
PRE Preliminary squad.
SEN Accepted call up to senior team.

Overage players in Olympic Games

Notable players from under-21 football team

Jo Bonfrere
Roy Makaay
Arnold Bruggink
Wilfred Bouma
Peter Wisgerhof
Victor Sikora
Mark van Bommel
Jan Vennegoor of Hesselink
Dirk Kuyt
Kenneth Vermeer
Gijs Luirink
Nicky Hofs
Stijn Schaars
Urby Emanuelson
Romeo Castelen
Klaas-Jan Huntelaar
Robin van Persie
Boy Waterman
Ron Vlaar
Ryan Donk
Gianni Zuiverloon
Hedwiges Maduro
Otman Bakkal
Maceo Rigters
Ryan Babel
Royston Drenthe
Tim Krul
Erik Pieters

Individual all-time records

Most capped players

Last updated: 29 May 2014

Most goals scored

Last updated: 17 November 2015

See also
 Netherlands national football team
 Netherlands national under-19 football team
 Netherlands national under-17 football team
 UEFA European Under-21 Football Championship

References

External links

 UEFA Under-21 website Contains full results archive
 The Rec.Sport.Soccer Statistics Foundation Contains full record of U-21/U-23 Championships.
Official KNVB U-21 site in Dutch

European national under-21 association football teams
Football
Youth football in the Netherlands